Capital High School (CHS), commonly referred to as Capital, is a public high school in Olympia, Washington, United States. It is one of two comprehensive high schools in the Olympia School District. Capital is located on Olympia's Westside, and serves the entire northwest corner of Thurston County. High School students from the Olympia School District and Griffin School District attend Capital.

Building history
Capital High School started remodeling the building in 2005 and it was completed on 2006 costing about $10.5 million. The new remodel included a new student commons, a 400-seat auditorium, an auxiliary gymnasium, fitness room, modernization of the library, alternative education, administrative offices, and four pod areas. McGranahan Partnership of Tacoma designed the project.

On Christmas morning of 2008 around 5 A.M., one of the remodeled sections of roof collapsed due to heavy snow. About 2,500 square feet of roof collapsed causing fire alarm to go off. The collapse also broke a natural gas line but crews were able to shut off the gas before it caused any damage to the building.

Sports
Capital High School is a 3A-division member of the Washington Interscholastic Activities Association. It is a member of the 3A South Sound Conference. (Capital High School was 4A-division until 2006–2007 season, 3A-division until 2007–2012 season, 2A-division until 2012-2014 and then moved back up to 3A Fall 2014).

State Championships, 2nd place:

Baseball - 1978, 1995, 1997; Boys Cross Country - 1996; Fastpitch Softball - 2007; Football - 2002; Boys Golf - 1987; Girls Golf - 1994; Girls Swimming - 2002; Boys Tennis - 1991, 1993; Girls Tennis - 1988, 1990; Girls Volleyball - 1994, 2013, 2014, 2019; Wrestling - 2000,

Notable alumni
 Eloise Mumford — Film and Broadway Actress
 Bill Bryant — Seattle Port Commissioner
 Rachel Corrie — American peace activist 
 Jed Hansen — former MLB player (Kansas City Royals)
 Joe Kraemer — former MLB player (Chicago Cubs)
 Andres Gonzales — PGA Golfer
 Adam Kasper — Record Exec.
 Travis Lee — Former Major League Baseball player
 Jared Sandberg — Former Professional Baseball Player
 Tobi Vail — Musician, Bikini Kill
 Brodie Buckland — 2012 Olympic Rower
 David Ainuu - Professional Rugby Player

References

External links
 Capital High School

High schools in Thurston County, Washington
Educational institutions established in 1975
Schools in Olympia, Washington
Public high schools in Washington (state)